Naleskino is a rural locality (a village) in Mstyora Urban Settlement, Vyaznikovsky District, Vladimir Oblast, Russia. The population was 34 as of 2010.

Geography 
Naleskino is located near the right bank of the Klyazma River, 18 km northwest of Vyazniki (the district's administrative centre) by road. Timino is the nearest rural locality.

References 

Rural localities in Vyaznikovsky District